Daniel Ellison (February 14, 1886 – August 20, 1960) was a U.S. Representative from Maryland.

Born in Russian Empire, Ellison was brought to the United States by his parents as an infant. He attended the public schools of Baltimore, Maryland, and graduated from Johns Hopkins University in 1907 and from the University of Maryland School of Law of Baltimore in 1909. He was admitted to the bar the same year and commenced practice in Baltimore.

A member of the Republican Party, he was a longtime member of the Baltimore City Council. He represented the fourth council district and served from May 1923 until December 1942 when he resigned to take his seat in Congress. During his 19 years on the City Council he was the only Republican member except during the term from 1927 to 1931 when nine of the nineteen councilmembers were Republicans.  No Republicans have served on the City Council since his resignation.

Ellison was elected as a Republican to the Seventy-eighth Congress, serving January 3, 1943 – January 3, 1945. He was an unsuccessful candidate for reelection in 1944 to the Seventy-ninth Congress, losing to his former Baltimore City Council Colleague George Hyde Fallon.

He resumed the practice of law in Baltimore. In 1946 he was elected to the Maryland Senate representing Baltimore's fourth legislative district. He was in office from January 1947 to January 1951. He chose not to run for reelection in 1950.

He died in Baltimore, and is interred in Hebrew Friendship Cemetery.

See also
List of Jewish members of the United States Congress

References

1886 births
1960 deaths
American people of Russian-Jewish descent
Baltimore City Council members
Burials at Hebrew Friendship Cemetery
Jewish members of the United States House of Representatives
Johns Hopkins University alumni
Republican Party Maryland state senators
Republican Party members of the United States House of Representatives from Maryland
Emigrants from the Russian Empire to the United States
University of Maryland, Baltimore alumni
20th-century American politicians